Mark Iacono (born November 24, 1966) is an American pizzaiolo, who founded the pizzeria Lucali in Carroll Gardens, Brooklyn in 2006. He has received national recognition for his restaurant and has since expanded to several locations around the country.

Early life
Mark Iacono was born and raised Brooklyn. When he was young he did not focus on cooking, but said his grandmother was an amazing cook and was an inspiration for him to become a cook.

Restaurant business
Prior to starting Lucali, Iacono worked in construction and focused on granite and marble fabrication. Iacono rented out a candy store he frequented in his youth located on Henry St in Brooklyn. Iacono wanted to keep a local pizzeria. Other than his grandmother, Iacono said that Domenico "Dom" DeMarco of Di Fara Pizza was another inspiration for him. He watched Dom take pizza to the next level. Iacono says when he started the restaurant with no experience, never having made a pizza in his life.

In 2011, Iacono was involved in a knife fight with ex-con and mobster Batista "Benny" Geritano. The fight was rumored to be over a shakedown from the mob wanting a cut of Iacono's profits. The altercation occurred at Joe's Superette, an old-fashioned store located at the corner of Carroll and Smith street.

Iacono has starred in multiple shows including Netflix's Ugly Delicious, The Pizza Show and Munchies. He has appeared a few times with pizzaiolo Frank Pinello. One of his favorite Italian comfort foods is the English muffin pizza.

References

External links
 

American chefs
American male chefs
American people of Italian descent
Living people
Pizza in New York City
1966 births